Marcos Paulo Souza Ribeiro (born 21 March 1974) is a former Brazilian football player.

Club statistics

Honours 

 J2. League Top Scorer: 2001

References

External links

Vegalta Sendai

1974 births
Living people
Brazilian footballers
Santa Cruz Futebol Clube players
Joinville Esporte Clube players
Esporte Clube Bahia players
Criciúma Esporte Clube players
Grêmio Foot-Ball Porto Alegrense players
J1 League players
J2 League players
Vegalta Sendai players
Association football forwards